Stewart Creek is a  long 1st order tributary to the Roaring River in Wilkes County, North Carolina.

Course
Stewart Creek rises about 1.5 miles southwest of Lomax, North Carolina and then flows southwest to join the Roaring River at about 6 miles northwest of Roaring River, North Carolina.

Watershed
Stewart Creek drains  of area, receives about 50.7 in/year of precipitation, has a wetness index of 323.98, and is about 62% forested.

References

Rivers of North Carolina
Bodies of water of Wilkes County, North Carolina